In 2020, Venstre would drop, mayor at the time, Henrik Frandsen as their candidate for the next election. This led to Henrik Frandsen along with 5 others, to create Tønder Listen, a breakout party who intended to get Henrik Frandsen reelected as mayor.

In the election result, Tønder Listen would win 9 seats, while Venstre would lose 9 seats and only win 6. 
However, Venstre wanted to avoid Henrik Frandsen continuing as mayor. Eventually, Jørgen Popp Petersen from regional party Schleswig Party had a majority backing him as mayor. The agreement consisted of the Social Democrats, the Conservatives, The New Right, Borgerlisten and Schleswig Party. This marked the first mayor from Schleswig Party in 75 years.

Electoral system
For elections to Danish municipalities, a number varying from 9 to 31 are chosen to be elected to the municipal council. The seats are then allocated using the D'Hondt method and a closed list proportional representation.
Tønder Municipality had 31 seats in 2021

Unlike in Danish General Elections, in elections to municipal councils, electoral alliances are allowed.

Electoral alliances  

Electoral Alliance 1

Electoral Alliance 2

Electoral Alliance 3

Results

Notes

References 

Tønder